Mohammadpur is an upazila of Magura District in the Division of Khulna, Bangladesh.

Geography 
It has 28158  households and a total area of 234.29 km2. The River Naboganga flows through the Upazila. Mohammadpur stands near the bank of Modhumoti river. The Modhumoti river divided Mohammadpur from Dhaka division.

Demographics
According to the 1991 Bangladesh census, Mohammadpur had a population of 160,340. Males constituted 50.58% of the population, and females 49.42%. The population aged 18 or over was 76,748. Mohammadpur had an average literacy rate of 25.8% (7+ years), compared to the national average of 32.4%.

Administration
Mohammadpur Upazila is divided into eight union parishads: Babukhali, Balidia, Binodepur, Digha, Mohammadpur, Nohata, Palashbaria, and Rajapur. The union parishads are subdivided into 131 mauzas and 188 villages.

Points of interest
Raja Sitaram Ray was an autonomous king, a vassal to the Mughal Empire, who revolted against the empire and established a short-lived sovereign Hindu dominion in Bengal region of the Indian subcontinent. 28 km from Magura Sadar, the house of Raja Sitaram Ray is located in Mohammadpur sub-district.

Notable residents
 Abdur Rasheed Biswas, Member of Parliament, lived in Khalia village.

See also 
Upazilas of Bangladesh
Districts of Bangladesh
Divisions of Bangladesh

References 

Upazilas of Magura District
Magura District
Khulna Division